Samundi is a 1992 Indian Tamil-language action drama film directed by Manoj Kumar. The film stars R. Sarathkumar and Kanaka. It was released on 18 September 1992.

Plot 

Samundi, his mother and his little sister Lakshmi move into their new house in a little village. Ponnuthayi, a washerwoman, sympathises with Samundi's family and she eventually falls in love with Samundi. Rajangam and his brother spread terror among the villagers. One day, the ringing of temple bells and the heralding of the festival throws Samundi into an uncontrollable fit of rage. Ponnuthayi asks the reason for his rage and Samundi tells her about his tragic past.

In the past, Samundi prepared his sister Rasathi's wedding and he took her to the temple. There, he clashed with some thugs. In the confrontation, Rasathi was pushed into the lake and drowned. The wedding was cancelled and Samundi's family left his village.

Samundi cannot tolerate any more the oppression of Rajangam's henchmen so he beats them. The villagers then acclaim Samundi, and Rajangam feels ridiculed. At Samundi's wedding, a police officer, who is under Rajangam's order, arrests the innocent Samundi. Samundi is then released after the villagers' pressure. The angry Samundi enters in Rajangam's house with a machete and kills Rajangam and to his surprise, he finds his sister Rasathi alive and wearing a white saree (widow's clothes). What transpires later forms the crux of the story.

Cast 

R. Sarathkumar as Samundi
Kanaka as Ponnuthayi
Meera as Rasathi
Sangita as Lakshmi
Goundamani
Mansoor Ali Khan as Rajangam
Uday Prakash
Varalakshmi as Samundi's mother
Ponnambalam
Samikannu as Ponnuthayi's father
Thideer Kannaiah
Sethu Vinayagam
Joker Thulasi
Singamuthu
King Kong

Production 
The film's shooting was held in Gobichettipalayam, a small town near Coimbatore, which became famous after the tremendous success of Chinna Thambi.

Soundtrack 
The music was composed by Deva, with lyrics written by Vaali.

Reception 
Malini Mannath of The Indian Express said, "The film offers nothing new in terms of entertainment nor can it keep viewers glued to their seats for long". The film completed a 100-day run at the box-office.

References

External links 
 

1990s Tamil-language films
1992 action drama films
1992 films
Films scored by Deva (composer)
Indian action drama films